Athis delecta is a moth in the Castniidae family. It is found in Costa Rica and Veracruz, Mexico.

References

Moths described in 1911
Castniidae